Paliganj Assembly constituency is one of 243 constituencies of legislative assembly of Bihar. It comes under Pataliputra Lok Sabha constituency along with other assembly constituencies viz. Danapur, Maner, Phulwari, Masaurhi and Bikram.

Overview

Paliganj comprises CD Blocks Dulhin Bazar & Paliganj.

Members of Legislative Assembly

^-bypoll

Election Results

2020

2015

See also
 List of constituencies of Bihar Legislative Assembly

References

External links
 

Assembly constituencies in Patna district
Politics of Patna district
Assembly constituencies of Bihar